Equestrian at the 2005 Islamic Solidarity Games was held in King Abdulaziz University, Jeddah from April 9 to April 14, 2005. The competition included only jumping events.

Medalists

Medal table

References
  kooora.com

2005 Islamic Solidarity Games
Islamic Solidarity Games
2005 in equestrian